Virbia rubicundaria, the ruddy holomelina, black-banded holomelina or least holomelina, is a moth in the  family Erebidae. It is found from Georgia and Florida, along the Gulf Coast to eastern Texas.

The length of the forewings is about 8.9 mm for males and 8.7 mm for females. The male forewings are clay with light orange hues. The female forewings are clay with light orange hues. The hindwings are flesh ocher with a brown discal spot and brown subterminal markings. There are multiple generations per year with adults on wing year-round.

Larvae have been reared on dandelion species and Lactuca floridana.

References

Natural History Museum Lepidoptera generic names catalog

rubicundaria
Moths described in 1827